Larry Giovando also known formally as Lorenzo Giovando (born March 10, 1905) was twice MLA in British Columbia's Legislative Assembly for the Conservative Party of British Columbia for the seat of Nanaimo and the Islands.  His 1952 and 1953 victories are examples of how the Instant runoff voting works to allow or ensure that a majority finds the candidate acceptable.

In the provincial election of 1952, on the first ballot he received only 3346 votes (31.9%) to CCF candidate Daniel Stupich's 3715 (35.4%), but since Stupich failed to receive a majority, the election was decided by "instant run-off" whereby the top two candidates received votes from the third and fourth place Liberal and Social Credit candidates.  When these votes were redistributed, Giovando emerged the winner 5144 (52.9%) to 4581 (47.1%).

The results of the 1953 election continued in the same vein as Giovando polled only 2,046 votes (20.8%) in the first ballot but managed 4,376 (50.1%) on the second, against Stupich's 3,631 (37.0%) on the first and 4,358 (49.9%) on the second.  It was the only seat the PCs would win in that election, and they would cease to be an electoral entity thereafter.

References

1982 deaths
British Columbia Conservative Party MLAs
Canadian people of Italian descent
1905 births
People from Ladysmith, British Columbia